Lestene Parish is an administrative unit of Tukums Municipality in the Semigallia region of Latvia. The administrative center is Lestene.

A historic church featuring ornate Baroque woodcarvings is located in Lestene.

Towns, villages and settlements of Lestene parish 
 Blāzma
 Burtnieki
 Lestene
 Mariņmuiža

References

External links

Parishes of Latvia
Tukums Municipality
Semigallia